Cavaillon Cathedral (Cathédrale Notre-Dame-et-Saint-Véran de Cavaillon) is a former Roman Catholic church located in the town of Cavaillon, Vaucluse, France. It is in the Romanesque architectural style, built in the 11th-13th century.

The cathedral is a national monument. Until the French Revolution, it was the seat of the Bishop of Cavaillon. The diocese was abolished by the Concordat of 1801 and annexed to the Diocese of Avignon.

It is classified under historical monuments by the 1840 list.

References

Former cathedrals in France
Churches in Vaucluse